Lilleküla is a subdistrict of the district of Kristiine in Tallinn, the capital of Estonia. It has a population of 24,939.

On the eastern side of Lilleküla there's a train station "Lilleküla" on the Elron's western route.

One of the largest shopping centres in Estonia, Kristiine Centre, is located in Lilleküla.

Gallery

See also
Culture Factory Polymer

References

Subdistricts of Tallinn